Sea rush is a common name for several rushes in the genus Juncus and may refer to:

Juncus kraussii, native to the Southern hemisphere
Juncus maritimus, native to the Northern hemisphere